Meyer & Berenberg was a London trading firm active in the West Indies trade in the late 17th and early 18th century. It was founded in the late 17th century by Sir Peter Meyer, a London merchant and a native of Hamburg who became an English citizen, and members of the Berenberg family, who originally belonged to the Dutch merchant colony of Hamburg and who likewise became English citizens. It was one of the largest international trade (import–export) companies of London of the era. It should not be confused with Berenberg Bank, founded by the main branch of the same family.

The company owned plantations on Barbados; Peter Meyer was also a shareholder of a sugar refinery in London.

Footnotes

Defunct companies based in London
Trading companies established in the 17th century
Berenberg-Gossler family
17th-century establishments in England
Trading companies of England